Rajini Chandy is an Indian actress who works primarily in Malayalam cinema. She debuted in 2016 Malayalam film Oru Muthassi Gadha by Jude Anthany Joseph. In 2020, she participated in the reality show Bigg Boss Malayalam season 2 and she got evicted in the 14th day.

Early life and education 
Rajini Chandy was born in Aluva, Kerala. After schooling she went to Alphonsa College, Palai for her degree course. Rajini is married to PV Chandy and then settled in Mumbai. They have a daughter settled in California with her husband and kids.

In 2020, Rajini Chandy created a chat and cook channel on YouTube.

A photoshoot done by Rajini Chandy went viral and which got featured on BBC News.

Filmography

Television

Advertisements 
 Bhima Jewellery

References

External links 

Living people
Indian film actresses
Actresses from Kerala
Actresses in Malayalam cinema
21st-century Indian actresses
Bigg Boss Malayalam contestants
Actresses in Malayalam television
1951 births